Đá Nhảy Beach is a beautiful beach on the shore of the East Sea, 40 km north of Đồng Hới city, Quảng Bình Province, Vietnam. Đá Nhảy in Vietnamese means "the rocks that jump", referring to the topographical feature of this beach which sees thousands rock reaching the sea, surrounding small fine sand beaches suitable for sea bathing. This is one of the most important attraction sites in Quảng Bình, along with Phong Nha-Kẻ Bàng National Park (a UNESCO World Heritage Site and Bang Spa.

References

External links
Introduction of Da Nhay Beach on Official website of Vietnam Tourism Authority

Landforms of Quảng Bình province
Beaches of Vietnam
Tourist attractions in Quảng Bình province